The scientific name Allium montanum has been used for at least six different species of Allium.

Allium montanum Schrank – the only legitimate name, first used in 1785, now considered a synonym of Allium schoenoprasum subsp. schoenoprasum (chives)

The following names are synonyms for other species:
Allium montanum F.W.Schmidt, nom. illeg. = Allium lusitanicum
Allium montanum Guss., nom. illeg. = Allium tenuiflorum
Allium montanum Rchb., nom. illeg. =  Allium flavum subsp. flavum
Allium montanum Sm. , nom. illeg. = Allium sibthorpianum
Allium montanum Ten., nom. illeg. =  Allium cupani subsp. cupani

References

Set index articles on plants